Patrick Kammerbauer (born 11 February 1997) is a German professional footballer who plays as a defensive midfielder for  club SC Verl.

Career
In January 2018, Kammerbauer joined SC Freiburg after rejecting 1. FC Nürnberg's offer to extend his contract which was due to expire in summer 2018. The transfer fee paid to Nürnberg was reported as in the region of €200,000 to 300,000.

On 28 January 2019, Kammerbauer joined Holstein Kiel on a loan deal until summer 2020 with an option to make the deal permanent.

On 2 September 2019, Kammerbauer joined Eintracht Braunschweig on a season-long loan deal with the option of a second year. Due to Eintracht Braunschweig's promotion to the 2. Bundesliga the loan was automatically extended by another year.

On 1 February 2023, Kammerbauer signed with 3. Liga club SC Verl.

References

1997 births
Living people
People from Weißenburg in Bayern
Sportspeople from Middle Franconia
German footballers
Footballers from Bavaria
Association football defenders
Germany youth international footballers
Bundesliga players
2. Bundesliga players
3. Liga players
Regionalliga players
1. FC Nürnberg II players
1. FC Nürnberg players
SC Freiburg players
SC Freiburg II players
Holstein Kiel players
Eintracht Braunschweig players
SC Verl players